Sirmour Assembly constituency (or Sirmaur) is one of the 230 Vidhan Sabha (Legislative Assembly) constituencies of Madhya Pradesh state in central India. This constituency came into existence in 1951, as one of the 48 Vidhan Sabha constituencies of the erstwhile Vindhya Pradesh state.

Overview
Sirmour (constituency number 68) is one of the eight Vidhan Sabha constituencies located in Rewa district. This constituency comprises Sirmour Revenue Inspector's (R.I.) circle of Sirmour tehsil, Sirmaur nagar panchayat, Baikunthpur nagar panchayat and Dabhaura and Jawa R.I. circles of Teonthar tehsil.

Sirmour is part of Rewa Lok Sabha constituency along with seven other Vidhan Sabha segments of this district, namely, Semariya, Teonthar, Mauganj, Deotalab, Mangawan, Rewa, and Gurh.

Members of Legislative Assembly

As a constituency of Madhya Bharat
1951,  Narmada Prasad Singh Kisan Mazdoor Praja Party

As a constituency of Madhya Pradesh

See also
 Sirmaur

References

Rewa district
Assembly constituencies of Madhya Pradesh